Leptoclinium is a genus of flowering plants in the family Asteraceae.

Species
There is only one known species, Leptoclinium trichotomum, native to the State of Goiás in Brazil.

References

Endemic flora of Brazil
Monotypic Asteraceae genera
Eupatorieae